The desert rain frog, web-footed rain frog, or Boulenger's short-headed frog (Breviceps macrops) is a species of frog in the family Brevicipitidae. It is found in Namibia and South Africa. Its natural habitat is the narrow strip of sandy shores between the sea and the sand dunes. It is threatened by habitat loss by such factors as mining and tourism.

Description
The desert frog is a plump species with bulging eyes, a short snout, short limbs, spade-like feet, and webbed toes. On the underside, it has a transparent area of skin through which its internal organs can be seen. Its color is yellowish-brown, and sand often adheres to its skin.

Unlike most other species of frogs, it develops directly from the egg into adults without passing through the tadpole stage. It has a stout body, with small legs, which makes it unable to hop or leap – instead, it walks around on the sand. Unusually for a frog, it does not require water in its habitat to survive. Its eyes are comparatively large and bulging. The lifespan ranges between 4 and 14 years.

Habitat
The small area of sand dunes often gets a lot of fog, which supplies moisture in an otherwise arid and dry region.

The habitat of desert rain frogs is limited to a narrow strip of land along the western coast of southern Africa, specifically in South Africa and Namibia. This area is characterized by sandy shores and sand dunes, and it is one of the few places in the world where these frogs can be found. The climate in this region is dry and arid, with very little rainfall, and the frogs are adapted to living in these conditions. They are able to survive in areas with very little water by burrowing underground and waiting out dry periods, and they are also able to absorb water through their skin. The desert rain frog's habitat is characterized by xerophytic vegetation, which is adapted to living in dry environments, and in the spring, the area blooms with a variety of flowering plants. Fog is also an important part of the desert rain frog's habitat, as it provides some moisture in an otherwise dry region.

Reproduction
During the breeding season, which occurs between June and October, male Desert Rain Frogs emerge from their burrows at night and call out to females using a distinctive squeaking sound. When a female hears a male's call and is interested in mating, she will approach him and the two will mate underground. After mating, the female will lay a clutch of eggs, which can range in size from 12 to 40 eggs. The eggs hatch into froglets, which do not go through a free-living tadpole stage like many other frog species. Instead, the froglets emerge fully formed from the eggs and are able to move and hunt for insects on their own.

Behaviour
The desert rain frog is nocturnal, spending the day in a burrow which is dug to a depth of  where the sand is moist. It emerges on both foggy and clear nights and wanders about over the surface of the dunes. Its footprints are distinctive and are often found around patches of dung where it is presumed to feed on moths, beetles, and insect larvae. It digs its way into the sand in the morning and its presence in a locality can be deduced from the little pile of loose sand dislodged by its burrowing activities. Breeding is by direct development of eggs laid in its burrow, there is no aquatic tadpole stage.  It produces a high-pitched squeaking sound when threatened. The male's croaking is also distinctly high-pitched.

Status
The number of individual frogs were previously decreasing but it is now unknown whether the population is decreasing or not. It is threatened by habitat loss caused by opencast diamond mining and road construction, as well as increased human settlement. Fortunately, Opencast diamond mining has recently ceased in south Africa. Attempts to restore the frogs' habitat by mining companies could mean that the frog is no longer threatened. However, no evidence has indicated that the frogs have actually recolonized their restored habitat.

References

External links
 

Breviceps
Frogs of Africa
Amphibians of Namibia
Amphibians of South Africa
Amphibians described in 1907
Taxa named by George Albert Boulenger
Viral videos
Taxonomy articles created by Polbot